Lyctus suturalis is a species of beetles in the family Bostrichidae (formerly in the family Lyctidae, which is now a subfamily of Bostrichidae), present in the Palearctic (including Europe) and the Near East. In Europe, it is only found in Belarus and Ukraine.

External links
Lyctus suturalis at Fauna Europaea

Bostrichidae
Beetles described in 1837